Geth may refer to:

 A fictional species of networked artificial intelligences in the fictional universe of Mass Effect
Legion, a notable representative of the geth
 The Kingdom of G'eth, the Dungeons and Dragons campaign setting for members of Outside Xbox and Outside Xtra